The 2014–15 Top League was the 12th season of Japan's domestic rugby union competition, the Top League. It kicked off on 30 August 2014. The final was held on 8 February 2015 and won by Panasonic Wild Knights, 30–12 over Yamaha Júbilo.

Teams

The only change to the make-up of the league was the Top Kyushu champion team Fukuoka Sanix replacing Kyuden Voltex.

Regular season
For the Pool stage, the 16 teams were placed into 2 pools of 8 teams each and a round-robin tournament was played within each of the pools.

Then, for the Group stage, the top 4 teams from each pool went through to Group 1, and the bottom 4 teams from each pool went through to Group 2. The teams were given starting points based on where they finished in their pool.
- i.e. starting points of 4, 3, 2, and 1, for 1st, 2nd, 3rd, and 4th respectively; and starting points of 4, 3, 2, and 1, for 5th, 6th, 7th, and 8th respectively.

Another round-robin was played for each of the groups. The Top League teams in Group 1 ranked 1st to 4th qualified for the title play-offs to fight for the Microsoft Cup and the Top League title. The top 4 also qualified directly into the All-Japan Rugby Football Championship.

The teams in Group 1 ranked 5th to 8th, and teams in Group 2 ranked 1st to 4th went through to the wildcard play-offs for qualification into the All-Japan Rugby Football Championship.

The teams in Group 2 ranked 5th to 7th went through to the promotion and relegation play-offs against regional challengers to fight to remain in the Top League. The team in Group 2 ranked 8th was automatically relegated to the regional leagues for 2015–16.

Standings

Group stage tables

Pool stage tables

Pool stage

Round 1

Round 2

Round 3

Round 4

Round 5

Round 6

Round 7

Group stage

Round 1

Round 2

Round 3

Round 4

Round 5

Round 6

Round 7

Title play-offs
Top 4 sides of the regular season competed in the Lixil Cup knock out tournament to decide the Top League champion. The top 4 teams of 2014–15 were Kobelco Steelers, Panasonic Wild Knights, Toshiba Brave Lupus, and Yamaha Júbilo.

Semi-finals

Final

Wildcard play-offs
The Top League Group 1 teams ranked 5–8 and Group 2 teams ranked 1–4 played off over two rounds, with the second round winners qualifying for the All-Japan Rugby Football Championship.

First round

Second round

 

 

So NEC Green Rockets and Suntory Sungoliath advanced to the All-Japan Rugby Football Championship.

Top League Challenge Series

Honda Heat won promotion to the 2015–16 Top League via the 2014–15 Top League Challenge Series, while Kamaishi Seawaves, Kyuden Voltex and Mitsubishi Sagamihara DynaBoars progressed to the promotion play-offs.

Promotion and relegation play-offs
The Top League teams in Group 2 ranked 5th, 6th, and 7th, played-off against the Challenge 1 teams ranked 4th, 3rd, and 2nd, respectively, for the right to be included in the Top League for the following season.

 

 

 

So Kubota Spears, Coca-Cola Red Sparks and Toyota Industries Shuttles remained in the Top League for the next season.

End-of-season awards

Team awards

Individual awards

Team of the season

References
 

Japan Rugby League One
 
Top League